Angustidontidae is an extinct family of eucarid crustaceans and the sole representatives of the order Angustidontida. They were predators ranging in size from about 4 to 9 centimetres in length and lived during the Late Devonian and Early Carboniferous periods.

They were some of the earliest Eucarids to develop maxillipeds, modified from the first or second thoracopods.

See also 
 Angustidontus

References 

Prehistoric Malacostraca
Prehistoric crustacean families